Exmouth railway station serves the town of Exmouth in Devon, England and is  south east of . The station is the terminus of the Avocet Line from Exeter St Davids (which branches off from the West of England Main Line after ). The station is managed by Great Western Railway, who operate all trains serving it.

History

The railway to Exmouth was opened on 1 May 1861. The first train started from Exeter Station comprising eleven carriages drawn by the engine Comet. The train with its complement of 150 passengers arrived in Exmouth at 8.16am.

New docks designed by Eugenius Birch were opened in 1866 and a short branch was laid to connect them to the goods yard.

A branch line with a junction immediately beyond the end of the platforms was opened on 1 June 1903. This ran around the outskirts of Exmouth on a long, curving viaduct, passing through  and then on to  meeting the Sidmouth branch line at  where it connected with an earlier line to Sidmouth Junction railway station. The line was closed to all traffic on 6 March 1967 following publication of the report The Reshaping of British Railways.

The original station consisted of a single platform with a track on either side.  It was rebuilt with four platform faces, opening on 20 July 1924.  An engine shed was provided from the earliest days on the east side of the station, opposite the platforms.  It was closed on 8 November 1963 following the introduction of DMU services on the line.

The station building was demolished and replaced with the present building. A single face (the old platform 2) was opened on 2 May 1976. The eastern side of the station was used for a new road which opened on 10 December 1981; the town's bus station and a swimming and sports centre are also built on the old station site.

Following the privatisation of British Rail the station was operated by Wales & West from 1997 to 2001 and Wessex Trains from 14 October 2001 until 31 March 2006 when operation of the station transferred to Great Western Railway.

Description
This station features a single platform, located on the right when arriving from Exeter. The station features a ticket office which is open on Mondays to Saturdays only, between 7:10 and 15:25. Ticket machines, station parking, and bike racks are also available. There are also public toilets just outside the station.

Services

There is one train roughly every 30-40 minutes to Paignton.

References

External links
 Video footage of Exmouth Station in 2016 and 1970

Railway stations in Devon
Railway stations in Great Britain opened in 1861
Former London and South Western Railway stations
Railway stations served by Great Western Railway
Exmouth
1861 establishments in England
DfT Category D stations